Ayaulym Amrenova (born 30 November 2001) is a Kazakh freestyle skier. She competed in the 2018 Winter Olympics in the moguls event.

References

2001 births
Living people
Freestyle skiers at the 2018 Winter Olympics
Freestyle skiers at the 2022 Winter Olympics
Kazakhstani female freestyle skiers
Olympic freestyle skiers of Kazakhstan
People from Aktobe
21st-century Kazakhstani women